Balkovec is a surname. Notable people with the surname include:

 Frank Balkovec (born 1959), Canadian football player
 Jure Balkovec (born 1994), Slovenian footballer
 Rachel Balkovec (born 1987), American baseball coach

See also